Kumaini (also, Coomine and Ku-mai-ni) is a former Awani settlement in Mariposa County, California. 

It was located at the lower end of Great Meadow in Yosemite Valley, approximately 0.25 miles (0.4 km) from Yosemite Falls.

References

Paiute villages
Former Native American populated places in the Sierra Nevada (United States)
Former settlements in Mariposa County, California
Yosemite National Park
Former Native American populated places in California